Paraguay–Turkey relations are the bilateral relations between Paraguay and Turkey. The Turkish Embassy in Asunción and Paraguayan Embassy in Ankara were opened in November 2018 and in February 2019 respectively.

Presidential Visits

Economic links

Trade volume between the two countries was 82.1 million USD in 2019 (Turkish exports/imports: 47.1/35 million USD).

Main exports of Paraguay are: soybeans, cotton, oil seeds and oleaginous fruits, charcoal, broad beans, beans, seeds, bran, and other residues of the sifting of cereals.

See also 
 Foreign relations of Paraguay
 Foreign relations of Turkey

References 

 
Turkey
Bilateral relations of Turkey